This article describes the history of computing in Romania.

HC family
The Romanian computers  (HC 85, HC 85+, HC 88, HC 90, HC 91 and HC 2000) were clones of the ZX Spectrum produced at ICE Felix from 1985 to 1994. HC 85 was first designed at Institutul Politehnic București by Prof. Dr. Ing. Adrian Petrescu (in laboratory), then redesigned at ICE Felix (in order to be produced at industrial scale). Their operating system was a BASIC interpreter.

aMIC
 was a Romanian microcomputer designed by Prof. Adrian Petrescu at Institutul Politehnic București in 1982, later produced at Fabrica de Memorii in Timișoara.

MARICA and DACICC
MARICA and the DACICC family (DACICC-1 and DACICC-200) were Romanian computers produced in 1959–1968 at T. Popoviciu Institute of Numerical Analysis, Cluj-Napoca.

Felix series
 was a Romanian IBM-PC compatible produced at ICE Felix in 1985–1990.

 was a family of Romanian computers produced by ICE Felix from 1970 to 1978. They were similar to IBM/360; their operating system was SIRIS.

 was a family of Romanian mini and microcomputers in 1975–1984.

CoBra
 was a Romanian personal computer produced at I.T.C.I Brașov, in 1986.

Independent
 was a series of Romanian minicomputers, manufactured from 1983 to 1989. They were compatible with DEC-PDP 11–34, running RSX-11M operating system. They were produced at ITC Timișoara, with memory chips also produced in Timișoara.

See also
 Electronics industry in the Socialist Republic of Romania
 History of computer hardware in Yugoslavia
 Computer systems in the Soviet Union
 History of computing in Poland
 History of computer hardware in Bulgaria

External links
 Soviet Block computers with references to Romania

Science and technology in Romania
Romania